Calosoma angulatum is a species of ground beetle in the subfamily of Carabinae. It was described by Louis Alexandre Auguste Chevrolat in 1834.

References

angulatum
Beetles described in 1834